Mount Feury is a mountain between Sikorski Glacier and Frankenfield Glacier on the northeast side of Noville Peninsula, Thurston Island. It was first delineated from air photos taken by U.S. Navy Operation Highjump in December 1946, and was named by the Advisory Committee on Antarctic Names for James Feury, a mechanic and snowmobile driver of the Byrd Antarctic Expedition, 1928–30.

See also 
 Mountains in Antarctica

Maps 
 Thurston Island – Jones Mountains. 1:500000 Antarctica Sketch Map. US Geological Survey, 1967.
 Antarctic Digital Database (ADD). Scale 1:250000 topographic map of Antarctica. Scientific Committee on Antarctic Research (SCAR). Since 1993, regularly upgraded and updated.

Further reading 
 International Symposium on Antarctic Earth Sciences 5th : 1987, Geological Evolution of Antarctica, Cambridge, England, P 401

External links 

 Mount Feury on USGS website
 Mount Feury on AADC website
 Mount Feury on SCAR website

References 

Mountains of Ellsworth Land